The 2011–12 University of North Dakota men's basketball team represented the University of North Dakota during the 2011–12 NCAA Division I men's basketball season. They were led by sixth year head coach Brian Jones, played their home games at the Betty Engelstad Sioux Center, with one home game at Ralph Engelstad Arena, and are members of the Great West Conference. They were champions of the Great West Basketball tournament for the second consecutive year and earned an automatic bid into the 2012 CollegeInsider.com Tournament where they lost in the first round to Drake.

This season North Dakota officially played without a mascot name after the decision to retire "Fighting Sioux" as the school's mascot amid controversy. However, the school is fighting to keep the mascot name and some continue to use it.

This was also North Dakota's final year as a member of the Great West as they became a full member of the Big Sky Conference in July 2012.

Roster

Schedule

|-
!colspan=9 style=| Exhibition

|-
!colspan=9 style=| Regular season

|-
!colspan=9 style=| Great West tournament

|-
!colspan=9 style=| CollegeInsider.com tournament

References

North Dakota Fighting Hawks men's basketball seasons
North Dakota
North Dakota
Fight
Fight